Gammarus pecos, commonly known as the Pecos amphipod, is a species of crustacean in family Gammaridae. It is endemic to Pecos County, Texas in the United States, where it is known from only two locations: Diamond Y Spring (sometimes known as Wilbank Spring) and Leon Creek.

Gammarus pecos is classified as a vulnerable species by the IUCN Red List. A portion of the spring and cienega habitat inhabited by this species is now protected as part of the Diamond Y Spring Preserve, a nature reserve, owned by the Nature Conservancy.

References

Crustaceans of the United States
pecos
Crustaceans described in 1970
Taxonomy articles created by Polbot
ESA endangered species
Endemic fauna of Texas